The Air Ambulance Service (TAAS) is a registered charity in the UK that runs two emergency air ambulances, the Warwickshire & Northamptonshire Air Ambulance (WNAA) and the Derbyshire, Leicestershire & Rutland Air Ambulance (DLRAA), and also  operates the national Children's Air Ambulance,  an emergency transfer service for seriously ill babies and children.

, the Charity's membership of the Association of Air Ambulances is suspended due to an investigation by the Charity Commission.

Operations

The charity runs three services, two are emergency helicopters covering Warwickshire, Northamptonshire, Derbyshire, Leicestershire and Rutland and the third is the Children's Air Ambulance that covers Great Britain and provides an emergency transfer service for seriously ill babies and children. Both WNAA and DLRAA attend incidents in the neighboring counties of Nottinghamshire, Lincolnshire, Staffordshire and West Midlands when requested, significantly increasing the coverage of the service.

All three of the services operated are registered with the Care Quality Commission, whose reports have identified high standards of emergency care.

WNAA and DLRAA both fly with a pilot, a doctor and a critical care paramedic on board. The Children's Air Ambulance flies with two pilots and a team of up to three NHS clinicians which includes at least one senior nurse and often a consultant.

The charity runs a retail operation for fundraising consisting of 57 shops. The retail head office and main warehouse is based in Kegworth, with a second warehouse in Daventry. The charity opened a superstore in Derbyshire in February 2019.

Aircraft
The charity currently leases four aircraft; two AgustaWestland AW109 helicopters from Sloane Helicopters, and two AgustaWestland AW169 helicopters from Specialist Aviation Services.
 G-RSCU, an AW109E based at Coventry Airport for the Warwickshire & Northamptonshire Air Ambulance.
 G-TAAS, an AW109SP based at East Midlands Airport for the Derbyshire, Leicestershire & Rutland Air Ambulance.
 G-PICU, an AW169 based at Oxford Airport covering the south of the country for The Children's Air Ambulance.
 G-TCAA, an AW169 based at Doncaster Sheffield Airport covering the north of the country for The Children's Air Ambulance.

Road vehicles

In addition to providing air ambulance services, the charity also operates two Skoda 4x4 Critical Care Rapid Response Vehicles based at Coventry Airport and East Midlands Airport. These are used to provide assistance and attend emergency incidents when the air ambulances are unavailable. The RRV's carry the same equipment as the helicopters including a defibrillator/cardiac monitor, CPR machine and kit bag containing medical consumables and drugs.

History

Warwickshire & Northamptonshire Air Ambulance was launched in 2003. By 12 June 2004, it had already flown its 1,000th mission. Just over two years later, on 10 October 2006, they had completed 5,000 incidents.

In 2008, the charity took over Derbyshire, Leicestershire & Rutland Air Ambulance, which had been struggling to raise funds. The service now serves over  Less than a year after Derbyshire, Leicestershire & Rutland Air Ambulance became the sister service to Warwickshire & Northamptonshire Air Ambulance, it flew its 1,000th mission on 17 January 2009.

At the beginning of 2010, Warwickshire & Northamptonshire Air Ambulance flew its 10,000th mission. The same year, the charity branched out into the retail sector, opening its first high street charity boutique in Rugby, Warwickshire.

In 2011, the two air ambulance services were brought together under the umbrella name of The Air Ambulance Service. In July of the same year, they were registered with the Care Quality Commission.

In 2012, the service started independently employing their paramedics full-time. The charity also launched a national recycling scheme and launched the Children's Air Ambulance.

On 12 May 2013, the Children's Air Ambulance carried out their first baby transfer. Derbyshire, Leicestershire & Rutland also flew its 5,000th mission on 5 June, following four years of service.

In October 2014, the Children's Air Ambulance carried out its 100th transfer.

In September 2018, the Children's Air Ambulance launched its two new AgustaWestland 169 helicopters which are based at London Oxford Airport and Doncaster Sheffield Airport. The new helicopters are significantly larger and higher specification than the previous aircraft featuring bespoke clinical equipment and an additional seat for a parent to accompany the patient and crew on transfers.

Funding and strategy
The Air Ambulance Service is an independent charity which receives no government funding. It raises funds from the general public, corporate supporters, lotteries and trusts. The charity also operates a chain of 57 shops which are based across the Midlands, M40 corridor and around London.

In 2013, the charity raised £11.1million to fund its services.
In 2017, the charity raised £20.5M to fund its services. In the same year they spent £6.0M on charitable activities (30% of spending).

The charity is working to a new strategic plan covering the period 2015 to 2020. Its key strategic priorities are to continue to improve the quality of all its services and for the Children's Air Ambulance to be able to meet at least 90% of the demand for helicopter transfers between local hospitals and specialist paediatric centres.

Criticisms
The Air Ambulance Service has been repeatedly criticised by the public, the Association of Air Ambulances, and other charities, for running fundraising and stock generation activities in areas covered by other air ambulance charities.

In 2013, the BBC published an insight into the charity, with previous employees of the charity as sources. The article stated that several thousands of pounds were spent on hiring Anton du Beke and Erin Boag to give dance classes to staff as a reward. The source, a former fundraising manager, also said that funds raised were largely spent on "the upkeep of the charity: salaries, cars, the recruitment of more and more senior personnel." And in some cases performance related bonuses. An investigation by the Charity Commission found that there had been a "lack of oversight" but only took advisory action. In their final report, the Charity Commission stated that "trustees have made good progress in improving the governance of the charity."

In March 2018, the charity was subject to allegations in The Sunday Times newspaper. The Charity Commission later announced it was re-opening its investigation as a result of the article.

See also   
Air ambulances in the United Kingdom

References

External links

  
 

Air ambulance services in England
Emergency medical services in the United Kingdom
Aviation organisations based in the United Kingdom
2005 establishments in the United Kingdom
Organizations established in 2005